Abraham González may refer to:
 Abraham González (general), (1782 - c. 1838), Argentine soldier who was governor of Tucumán Province, Argentina
 Abraham González (governor), (1864 – 1913), governor of the Mexican state of Chihuahua
 Abraham González Uyeda (born 1966), Mexican politician
 Abraham Arrieta González, Mexican luchador, or professional wrestler
 Abraham González (footballer) (born 1985), Spanish footballer
 Abraham González International Airport, an airport in Ciudad Juárez, Chihuahua, Mexico

Gonzalez, Abraham